Peter Millett may refer to

 Peter Millett, Baron Millett (1932–2021), British judge
 Peter Millett (diplomat) (born 1955), British ambassador to Libya